Bintangor may refer to:

 Bintangor, hardwood trees of the genus Calophyllum
 Bintangor, Sarawak, a town in Sarawak, island of Borneo, Malaysia
 Bintangor River, a river in Sarawak, island of Borneo, Malaysia

Tropical hardwood that is termite resistant